Miliariconus has become a synonym of the subgenus Conus (Virroconus) Iredale, 1930, represented as Conus Linnaeus, 1758, as shown in In the latest classification of the family Conidae by Puillandre N., Duda T.F., Meyer C., Olivera B.M. & Bouchet P. (2015) 

These are  sea snails, marine gastropod mollusks in the family Conidae, the cone snails and their allies.

Species list
This list of synonyms of species is based on the information in the World Register of Marine Species (WoRMS) list.

 Miliariconus abbreviatus (Reeve, 1843): synonym of  Conus abbreviatus Reeve, 1843
 Miliariconus aristophanes (G.B. Sowerby II, 1857): synonym of  Conus aristophanes G. B. Sowerby II, 1857
 Miliariconus coronatus (Gmelin, 1791): synonym of  Conus coronatus Gmelin, 1791
 Miliariconus encaustus (Kiener, 1845): synonym of  Conus encaustus Kiener, 1845
 Miliariconus lecourtorum (Lorenz, 2011) : synonym of Conus lecourtorum (Lorenz, 2011)
 Miliariconus miliaris (Hwass in Bruguière, 1792): synonym of  Conus miliaris Hwass in Bruguière, 1792
 Miliariconus taeniatus (Hwass in Bruguière, 1792): synonym of  Conus taeniatus Hwass in Bruguière, 1792
 Miliariconus tiaratus (G.B. Sowerby I, 1833): synonym of  Conus tiaratus G. B. Sowerby I, 1833

References

Further reading 
 Kohn A. A. (1992). Chronological Taxonomy of Conus, 1758-1840". Smithsonian Institution Press, Washington and London.
 Monteiro A. (ed.) (2007). The Cone Collector 1: 1-28.
 Berschauer D. (2010). Technology and the Fall of the Mono-Generic Family The Cone Collector 15: pp. 51-54
 Puillandre N., Meyer C.P., Bouchet P., and Olivera B.M. (2011), Genetic divergence and geographical variation in the deep-water Conus orbignyi complex (Mollusca: Conoidea)'', Zoologica Scripta 40(4) 350–363.

External links
 To World Register of Marine Species
  Gastropods.com: Conidae setting forth the genera recognized therein.

Conidae